J. W. Pepper & Son, Inc. is a privately owned, American sheet music retailer based in Exton, Pennsylvania. The company is credited with being the largest sheet music retailer in the world, with over 750,000 titles in its catalog. Customers who buy music from Pepper include individual musicians, community organizations and professional ensembles, with the main customer base being school and church music directors.

History
James Welsh Pepper was born in Philadelphia in 1853, and died in the same city on July 28, 1919. He was an American music publisher and musical instrument maker.

In 1876, Pepper founded a publishing house in his home city which printed music tutorial books and a magazine called Musical Times, which ceased production in 1912. Additionally, Pepper produced musical instruments such as drums until 1910, the year in which J. W. Pepper & Son was founded. Pepper is often credited with inventing the sousaphone around 1893, although there have been some disputes to this claim.

Company details
J. W. Pepper has 12 regional marketing centers, along with two distribution centers dedicated to order fulfillment and shipping. In spring of 2009, Pepper added two new warehouses to the company's distribution network. In October 2013, the company's headquarters moved further west to Exton, Pennsylvania.

References

External links
 J. W. Pepper & Son corporate website
 
Dean Burtch NAMM Oral History Program Interview (2004)
Lee Paynter NAMM Oral History Program Interview (2015)
Glenn Burtch NAMM Oral History Program Interview (2016)
Ron Rowe NAMM Oral History Program Interview (2016)
Charles Slater NAMM Oral History Program Interview (2016)

Music retailers of the United States
Companies based in Chester County, Pennsylvania
Retail companies established in 1876
1876 establishments in Pennsylvania
Privately held companies based in Pennsylvania